This list of theaters and concert halls in Manila includes present-day performing arts theaters, concert halls, music halls and other places of live entertainment in Metro Manila, Philippines. It excludes theatrical companies, sports stadia, other outdoor venues and convention centers which may occasionally be used for concerts.

See also
Art Deco theaters of Manila

External links
Venues.ph

References

 
Theaters